Johnlongia is an extinct genus of sand shark from the Cretaceous period. It contains two described species, J. parvidens and J. allocotodon, and possibly a third unnamed species from the Niobrara Chalk. It is presumed piscivorous; however, it forms a clade with an early filter-feeding shark genus, Pseudomegachasma.

References

Prehistoric shark genera
Odontaspididae
Late Cretaceous fish of North America